Shane Dooley (born 26 September 1986) is an Irish hurler who currently plays as a right corner-forward for the Offaly senior team.

Born in Tullamore, County Offaly, Dooley was born into a strong hurling family. His paternal and maternal granduncles as well as his grandfather enjoyed All-Ireland success with the Offaly junior team in 1923 and 1929. His father, Joe Dooley, and his uncles, Johnny and Billy Dooley, won seven All-Ireland medals between them between 1985 and 1998.

Dooley first played competitive inter-county hurling and Gaelic football with Tullamore College. Here he won a Leinster Vocational Schools Junior B Championship medal and an All-Ireland Vocational Schools Championship medal. Dooley simultaneously came to prominence at juvenile and underage levels with the Tullamore club. As a dual player at senior level he has won one county hurling championship medal and three senior football championship medals. While studying at the University of Limerick, Dooley won a Fitzgibbon Cup medal in 2011.

Dooley made his debut on the inter-county scene as a dual player when he was selected for the Offaly minor teams. He later lined out for the Offaly under-21 teams in both codes before concentrating on hurling after making his senior debut during the 2007 league. Since then, Dooley has become a regular member of the starting fifteen as well as Offaly's top championship scorer of all time.

As a member of the Leinster inter-provincial team on a number of occasions, Dooley won a Railway Cup medal in 2012.

Career statistics

References 

1986 births
Living people
Shane
Dual players
Tullamore hurlers
Tullamore Gaelic footballers
Offaly inter-county hurlers
Offaly inter-county Gaelic footballers
Leinster inter-provincial hurlers
People from Tullamore, County Offaly